Eugène Lemaire (Vireux-Molhain, 1874 – Charleroi, 1948) was a Belgian pictorialist photographer. He is an excellent artist of portrait and still life. He was a friend of Léonard Misonne.

Exhibitions 
 XXVIIème Salon International d'Art Photographique, 1932.(Paris, France).
 1er Salon International de Charleroi, 1934. (Charleroi, Belgium).
 Cercle photographique Verviétois, 1938 (Verviers, Belgium).
 Exhibitions in USA (Los Angeles), Canada and Germany.(Source:Vintage Works, Ltd, USA)
 Maison de la Culture de Namur, 2003 (Namur, Belgium)
 Musée d'Art Letton de Riga. Expo Art/W20, 2005 (Riga, Latvia)

Bibliography 
 Pour une histoire de La photographie en Belgique, Musée de la Photographie, Charleroi 1993.
 De photokunst in Belgïe 1839–1940 Het Sterkshof.
 XXème siècle, L'Art en Wallonie Renaissance du Livre, 2001

References

External links 
 a collection: https://sites.google.com/site/eugenelemairecollection

Belgian photographers
Pictorialists
1874 births
1948 deaths